Waterhouse Spur is a spur of well-exposed strata that juts southwest from the south portion of Ackerman Ridge, 6 nautical miles (11 km) northeast of Johansen Peak, in the La Gorce Mountains. First mapped by United States Geological Survey (USGS) from surveys and U.S. Navy air photos, 1960–64. Named by New Zealand Geological Survey Antarctic Expedition (NZGSAE), 1969–70, for Barry C. Waterhouse, a member of the geological party who worked here.

Ridges of Marie Byrd Land